X My Heart may refer to:

X My Heart (album), 1996 album by Peter Hammill
"X My Heart" (song), 2018 song by Aisel that represented Azerbaijan in the Eurovision Song Contest

See also
Cross My Heart (disambiguation)